Asociación Deportiva Bagua Grande Fútbol Club (sometimes referred as Bagua Grande) is a Peruvian football club, playing in the city of Bagua Grande, Amazonas, Peru.

History
The Asociación Deportiva Bagua Grande Fútbol Club was founded on September 20, 2012.

In 2013 Copa Perú, the club classified to the Regional Stage, but was eliminated by UD Chulucanas in the Group Stage.

In 2014 Copa Perú, the club classified to the Regional Stage, but was eliminated by Cristal Tumbes in the Semifinals.

In 2015 Copa Perú, the club classified to the National Stage, but was eliminated when finished in 25th place.

In 2018 Copa Perú, the club classified to the National Stage, but was eliminated when finished in 35th place.

Honours

Regional
Liga Departamental de Amazonas:
Winners (4): 2013, 2014, 2018, 2022
Runner-up (1): 2015

Liga Provincial de Utcubamba:
Winners (5): 2013, 2014, 2015, 2017, 2018
Runner-up (1): 2022

Liga Distrital de Bagua Grande:
Winners (6): 2013, 2015, 2017, 2018, 2019, 2022

See also
List of football clubs in Peru
Peruvian football league system

References

External links
 

Football clubs in Peru
Association football clubs established in 2012
2012 establishments in Peru